Big Spring Army Glider Training School is an abandoned facility located approximately  north-northwest of Big Spring, Texas.  It is now farmland and no trace of it exists.

History
The facility consisted of a 7,000' dirt runway located in a sparsely populated area.  It was activated on 10 July 1942 and was operated under contract to the United States Army Air Forces by Big Spring Flying Service.

Used primarily C-47 Skytrains and Waco CG-4 unpowered gliders.  The mission of the school was to train glider pilot students in proficiency in operation of gliders in various types of towed and soaring flight, both day and night, and in servicing of gliders in the field.

Training ceased with students transferred to Big Spring Army Airfield due to inadequacy of water supply and barracks heating on 15 January 1943.

See also
 Texas World War II Army Airfields
 36th Flying Training Wing (World War II)

References

 Manning, Thomas A. (2005), History of Air Education and Training Command, 1942–2002. Office of History and Research, Headquarters, AETC, Randolph AFB, Texas. 
 Shaw, Frederick J. (2004), Locating Air Force Base Sites, History’s Legacy, Air Force History and Museums Program, United States Air Force, Washington DC. 

1942 establishments in Texas
USAAF Contract Flying School Airfields
USAAF Glider Training Airfields
Airfields of the United States Army Air Forces in Texas
Buildings and structures in Howard County, Texas